Pozniaky is a station of Kyiv Metro's Syretsko-Pecherska Line. It is situated between Osokorky and Kharkivska stations. This station was opened on 28 December 1994. The station is named after the nearby residential area Poznyaki.

The station was designed by architects Tselikovska, Hnievyshev and Panchenko. Pozniaky station has 2 entrances. This station is situated in the crossing of Mykoly Bazhana Avenue and Petra Hryhorenka Avenue in the Pozniaky masyv (neighborhood).

Pozniaky station operates from 05:45 to 00:04.

Kyiv Metro stations
Railway stations opened in 1994
1994 establishments in Ukraine